Lafitte is an unincorporated community and census-designated place (CDP) in Jefferson Parish, Louisiana, United States. The population was 972 at the 2010 census, and 816 in 2019. In 2020, its population increased to 1,014 people. It is part of the New Orleans–Metairie–Kenner metropolitan statistical area. Lafitte is located at the southern end of Louisiana Highway 45 along Bayou Barataria, and fishing is a major part of the local economy and culture.

Geography
Lafitte is located at  (29.677566, -90.105386). Lafitte is bordered to the north by the town of Jean Lafitte, and to the west, across Bayou Barataria, by unincorporated Barataria.

Demographics

The 2019 American Community Survey estimated 816 people lived in the CDP, down from 972 at the 2010 U.S. census. At the 2020 United States census, there were 1,014 people, 316 households, and 222 families residing in the CDP, up from the 2019 census estimates. In 2019, the racial and ethnic makeup was 89% non-Hispanic white, and 11% two or more races; the 2020 census determined 80.87% of the population was non-Hispanic white, 0.79% Black or African American, 1.78% Native American, 1.58% Asian, 9.17% two or more races, and 5.82% Hispanic or Latino American of any race; this has been in contrast to its once predominantly non-Hispanic white population as the U.S. diversifies overall. According to the 2019 estimates, the median household income was $58,375 and 19.2% lived at or below the poverty line.

Education
Lafitte residents are zoned to Jefferson Parish Public Schools.

Residents in K–6 are zoned to Lafitte Elementary School. Grades 7–12 are zoned to Fisher Middle-High School.

References

External links 

Census-designated places in Jefferson Parish, Louisiana
Census-designated places in Louisiana
Census-designated places in New Orleans metropolitan area